Public Library is the seventh studio album by The Burning Hell. It takes songwriter Mathias Kom's story songs further than ever before, and all tracks have been given a literary classification. The band recorded the album in the middle of a UK tour in Ramsgate at Big Jelly Studios. The album was mixed by Jeff McMurrich at 6 Nassau in Toronto, and mastered by Bo Kondren at Calyx in Berlin.

Track listing 

 "The Stranger" (Murder Mystery)
 "The Road" (Music Biography)
 "Fuck the Government, I Love You" (Romantic Comedy)
 "Men Without Hats" (Coming of Age story)
 "Good Times" (True Crime)
 "Give Up" (Literary Criticism/Philosophy)
 "Two Kings" (Science Fiction/Fantasy)
 "Nonfiction" (Romance)

Personnel 

 Mathias Kom - guitar, trombone, vocals
 Darren Browne - guitar, vocals
 Nick Ferrio - bass, vocals
 Jake Nicoll - drums, organ, vocals
 Ariel Sharratt - clarinet, saxophone, vocals

2016 albums
The Burning Hell albums